Pristava pod Rako is a small settlement south of Raka in the Municipality of Krško in eastern Slovenia. The area is part of the traditional region of Lower Carniola. It is now included with the rest of the municipality in the Lower Sava Statistical Region.

Name
The name of the settlement was changed from Pristava to Pristava pod Rako in 1953.

References

External links
Pristava pod Rako on Geopedia

Populated places in the Municipality of Krško